Callum Woodhouse  is a British actor.

Career
He is best known for his portrayal of Leslie Durrell in all four seasons of ITV comedy-drama series The Durrells.

Woodhouse is also known for playing the character of Josh Marsden in ITV comedy-drama series Cold Feet.

He also appeared as Randall Jones in "The Skylark Scandal", a Series 7 episode of BBC One's detective period drama Father Brown.

In the Channel 5/PBS production All Creatures Great and Small about James Herriot, Woodhouse plays Tristan Farnon, the younger brother of the senior partner, Siegfried Farnon. The programme was renewed for a second series, also of six episodes plus a Christmas special, which aired in September 2021. A third series was broadcast in 2022.

External links

References 

Living people
British television actors
21st-century British actors
1994 births